was a town located in Gunma District, Gunma Prefecture, Japan.

As of June 30, 2004, the town had an estimated population of 22,303 and a total area of 93.59 km².

On October 1, 2006, Haruna was merged into the expanded city of Takasaki.

Geography
Located in central Gunma Prefecture, the town is slightly hilly. The town got its name from the mountain in which it is situated on the slopes of, Mount Haruna.

 Mountain: Mount Haruna
 Lake: Lake Haruna

Surrounding municipalities
 Gunma Prefecture
 Shibukawa
 Takasaki
 Annaka
 Higashiagatsuma

Sister cities

In Japan
 Higashikurume, Tokyo

Overseas
  Grandview, Missouri

Trivia
Haruna is known as Akina in the anime/manga Initial D, and is the main character Takumi's home.

External links
 Takasaki city official website 

Dissolved municipalities of Gunma Prefecture
Takasaki, Gunma